CRB or CrB may refer to:

Organisations
 Centre de Recherche Berbère
 Chabab Riadhi Belouizdad, an Algerian football team
 Clinical Research Bureau, the first birth control clinic in the United States
 Clube de Regatas Brasil, a Brazilian football team
 Commission for Relief in Belgium
 Contract Recognition Board, in motor racing
 Copyright Royalty Board, US
 Country Roads Board, Victoria, Australia, 1913-1983
 Criminal Records Bureau, UK, later Disclosure and Barring Service

Other uses
 Central Railway Building, in Bangladesh
 Collarenebri Airport, IATA airport code "CRB"
 Chris Robinson Brotherhood, US band
 Claremont Review of Books, a political journal
 Corona Borealis constellation, CrB
 Cramér–Rao bound, in statistics
 Refinitiv/CoreCommodity CRB Index, of commodity futures